The Owyhee Avalanche is a weekly newspaper in Homedale, Idaho, United States, which is published Wednesday mornings and serves the Owyhee County area of Southwestern Idaho.

The Owyhee Avalanche has a weekly circulation of nearly 8,000. The Owyhee Avalanche's publisher is Joe Aman. Its managing editor is Jon Brown.

History
Owyhee County has had many newspapers since J. L. Hardin and John and Joe Wasson printed the first issue of the Owyhee Avalanche. That was on August 19, 1865.
  That first Owyhee County newspaper was published in Ruby City. Two of the Avalanche publishers—the Wasson brothers—bought out Hardin, and, almost a year to the day after its beginning, the Wasson brothers had moved the plant to Owyhee County's boom town Silver City. On August 18, 1866, volume 2, number 1 of the Avalanche was published at the new location, with the Wassons as proprietors.
  But the Avalanche was not the first newspaper in Silver City. Making its debut in June 1866—two months before the Avalanche moved there—a publication called the “Idaho Index” hit the streets. The Index was short-lived, however, and in December 1866, it ceased publication. The Wassons continued publishing the Avalanche until August 1867, when they sold out to W. J. Hill and H. W. Millard. Then, in November 1868, the pair sold the Avalanche to John McGonigle. However, only a few months later, McGonigle gave it back to Hill and Millard. Another newspaper began publication in Silver City. Two brothers, J. S. and Thomas Butler established the “Tidal Wave.” The date the Tidal Wave began is uncertain but in February 1870, it too ceased publication and was incorporated into the Avalanche. Hill and Millard dissolved the partnership in the Avalanche July 16, 1870, and Hill became sole owner and publisher of the Avalanche.
  The name of the Owyhee Avalanche was changed to the “Idaho Avalanche” when, in 1874, Hill started the first daily newspaper in the Idaho Territory. The daily continued for about  years, and then Hill went back to a weekly newspaper, but continued the “Idaho Avalanche” name. Shortly after reverting to a weekly newspaper, the publisher sold to J. S. Hay. The date was April 18, 1876. After Hay's stint as editor, the Avalanche was sold or leased several times. Some of the editors and publishers who ran the Avalanche for the next 10 or 12 years were: Guy Newcomb and Dave Adams, C. H. Hayes, and John Laub and Lem York. Laub and York had started the “DeLamar Nugget,” (ten miles downstream from Silver City) in May 1891. In 1901, the two men divided the partnership; Laub took the Nugget and York the Avalanche.
  York changed the name of the “Idaho Avalanche” back to the “Owyhee Avalanche on August 20, 1897. He continued as publisher until 1902, when he moved to Boise and co-founded Syms-York Co. With the departing of York, Laub moved the “DeLamar Nugget” to Silver City renaming it the “Silver City Nugget”. Then, in 1905, the name was again changed, this time to the “Owyhee Nugget”. What happened to the Avalanche following York's departure is uncertain. One account is that it merely closed, while another account says a group of “local politicians” bought the paper and continued it until 1908, when a fire destroyed the printing plant.
  At any rate, the Avalanche was out of business early in the 1900s — but only for a short period.
  In 1912, Laub sold the “Owyhee Nugget” to Frank Burrough, who, believing the future growth of Owyhee County would be in the Bruneau Valley, moved the operation to Bruneau. The Silver City folks were unhappy that they had no newspaper, and that same year funds were collected and pledged to revive the “Owyhee Avalanche”, and a new printing plat was ordered from American Type Traders of Portland, Oregon.

  The new owners hired Frank Trotter as editor of the new Avalanche. But Trotter stayed only one year, and shortly after that he moved to Homedale to establish the “Homedale Empire Press” on February 12, 1914.
In 1913, J. S. Flannagan became editor of the Avalanche. Flannigan left Silver City in the winter of 1917–18, and a man by the name of Charles Hackney became editor. In 1918 another newspaper entered the picture. The “Owyhee Leader” began, and gave Silver City as its location of publication. However, research suggests the Leader was actually published by the “Nampa Leader Herald.” The “Owyhee Leader” lasted until 1921.
  In the meantime, Hackney continued publishing the Avalanche until December 23, 1932. On January 26, 1933, R. H. Colley, publisher of the relatively new “Owyhee Chronicle” purchased the subscription list and rights to the “Owyhee Avalanche.”
  
In Homedale, the “Homedale Empire Press” had been purchased by the Wilder Herald, following the death of Trotter in a duel.
  Homedale was again without a newspaper until April 30, 1931, when the “Owyhee Chronicle” was established by Charles O. Davis. Davis published it until 1932, when it was purchased by R. H. Colley.
  Colley published the Chronicle until 1938. His wife Grace took over at the helm until two of her sons, Everett and Kenneth, became publishers. It was 1941.
Then in 1954 Kenneth left the newspaper business, leaving the Chronicle in the hands of brother Everett. Everett Colley remained publisher of the Chronicle until 1975, except for a period in 1952-54 when the paper was leased to Elwood Gough, and again between 1966 and 1967 when it was sold to Tom Mills.
  Mills gave it back to Colley, who continued as publisher until it was sold to Joe Aman on March 1, 1975.
Meanwhile, the “Owyhee Nugget” was sold to H. W. Gahau. In 1916, it was sold to Charles Pascoe. In 1939, the “Nugget” was published by Rodney and Leona Hawes. The following year, the “Nugget” was moved to Marsing, and Hawes continued as publisher until the paper was purchased by Mick and Kyle Hodges in 1982.

  After Hawes moved the Nugget to Marsing, the Nugget and the Chronicle were having a new battle for supremacy. Part of the competition included each publisher producing a newspaper for the other town.

  The Nugget began the “Homedale News”, and the Chronicle produced the “Marsing Chronicle.” Although each held its own second class mailing permit, they typically were a makeover of the respective sister paper.
  Aman published the Chronicle until 1984, when, in September, he sold it to Ted Grossman. After one week as publisher, the new owner turned it back to Aman. Again, in November of that same year, Aman sold the newspaper to Randall Howell, who published until March 1984.
  Aman was again back in the newspaper business. Then, on December 20, Aman purchased the Owyhee Nugget from Mick and Kyle Hodges, combining the two papers into The Owyhee Avalanche.
  In 2010, Aman marked his 35th anniversary of taking over as publisher of Owyhee County's news source. It's also the 25th anniversary of the return of the Avalanche nameplate.

Cities
 Bruneau
 Grand View
 Homedale
 Marsing
 Murphy
 Riddle
 Silver City
 Jordan Valley

Owyhee Cam
 Owyhee Cam

External links
 The Owyhee Avalanche

Newspapers published in Idaho
Companies based in Idaho
Mass media in Boise, Idaho